Karl August Devrient (5 April 17973 August 1872) was a German stage actor best known for performances of Schiller and Shakespeare. He was related to other notable German actors, including:
 his uncle Ludwig;
 his brothers Philipp Eduard and Gustav Emil;
 his wife, operatic soprano Wilhelmine Schröder-Devrient;
 his sons,  and Max;
 his nephew, Otto.
There is a collection relating to his life at the Österreichisches Theatermuseum.

Biography
Devrient was born in Berlin. Prior to his acting life, he was a cavalry officer and fought with the Hussars against Napoleon at Waterloo. He died in Bad Lauterberg.

Devrient had his acting debut in 1819 in Braunschweig In 1821 he received an engagement at the court theatre in Dresden, where, in 1823, he married Wilhelmine. In 1835 he joined the company at Karlsruhe, and in 1839 that at Hanover. His best-known roles were Wallenstein, Goethe's Faust, and King Lear.

References

External links

1797 births
1872 deaths
German male stage actors
Male actors from Berlin
German military personnel of the Napoleonic Wars
Male Shakespearean actors